Yashvir Singh  is an Indian politician and was Member of Parliament of the 15th Lok Sabha of India. He was elected from the Nagina constituency of Uttar Pradesh in 2009 and is a member of the samajwadi party political party.

Early life and education
Yashvir Singh was born in village (Mahmoodpur) Sahaspur Bijnor in the state of Uttar Pradesh, Dhobi family. An engineer by qualification, Singh holds a B.Tech degree from HBTI, Kanpur. By profession, Singh is an agriculturist.

Political career
Singh is a first time M.P and also the first elected M.P from the newly formed Nagina constituency. This constituency came into existence in 2008, as a part of delimitation of parliamentary constituencies based on the recommendations of the Delimitation Commission of India constituted in 2002.

Posts held

See also

15th Lok Sabha
Politics of India
Parliament of India
Government of India
Sahaspur
Samajwadi Party
Nagina (Lok Sabha constituency)

References 

India MPs 2009–2014
1972 births
Samajwadi Party politicians
Lok Sabha members from Uttar Pradesh
People from Bijnor
People from Bijnor district
Living people